Vincent Pastore (born July 14, 1946) is an American actor. Often cast as a mafioso, he is best known for his portrayal of Salvatore "Big Pussy" Bonpensiero on the HBO series The Sopranos.

Early life
Pastore was born on July 14, 1946 to an Italian-American family in the Bronx, New York City, and grew up in New Rochelle, New York. Following his graduation from high school, he enlisted as a sailor in the U.S. Navy and then attended Pace University for three years, before eventually going into the acting industry after befriending Matt Dillon and Kevin Dillon. On June 3, 2015, during an appearance on Good Day New York, Pastore said he was in the club business for close to 30 years, and got into acting in his forties.

Career

Acting
Pastore has made a career of portraying Italian-American gangsters in film and television. He began with small parts in the 1990s, in films such as Goodfellas and Carlito's Way. In Goodfellas, he is briefly seen rolling a coat rack through the kitchen of The Bamboo Lounge and is credited as "Vinny Pastore" playing "Man with Coat Rack". In Carlito's Way, he portrays one of the friends of the Italian man that dances with Gail, whom Kleinfeld insults. He is listed in the credits as "Vinny Pastore" playing "Copa Wiseguy."

Pastore got a bigger role in the comedy/crime film The Jerky Boys: The Movie (1995) as Tony Scarboni, one of the three gangsters and Lazarro's (played by Alan Arkin) clients. In the 1996 HBO television movie Gotti, Pastore played the character of Angelo Ruggiero, alongside future Sopranos cast members Tony Sirico, Frank Vincent and Dominic Chianese.

In 1999, Pastore got his biggest role in The Sopranos, where he played the character Salvatore "Big Pussy" Bonpensiero.

In addition to The Sopranos, he has appeared in Mickey Blue Eyes, Flodders in America, Two Family House (with The Sopranos cast mates Michael Rispoli, Kathrine Narducci, Matt Servitto, Michele Santopietro and Sharon Angela), Under Hellgate Bridge, Riding in Cars with Boys, Witness to the Mob, Deuces Wild, Made, Mafia!, The Hurricane, Serving Sara, American Cousins, A Tale of Two Pizzas, This Thing of Ours, Remedy, Shark Tale, Bachelor Party Vegas, The Family, Once Upon a Time in Brooklyn, Money Train, A Brooklyn State of Mind, The Deli, The Last Don II, Johnny Slade's Greatest Hits and Guy Ritchie's Revolver. He served as associate producer of the film Doughboys. He also appeared in a Cyberchase for Real segment as the owner of a comedy and magic club.

Pastore's other television credits include Grounded for Life, character Vinnie Fellachio in Son of the Beach, Law & Order (various roles from 1992 to 1996), the soap opera One Life to Live, host of Repo-Men/Stealing for a Living, Ed, Queens Supreme, Vegas, Everybody Hates Chris, The Making of the Mob: New York, Blue Bloods, The Making of the Mob: Chicago, and an uncredited voice role in the television program Aqua Teen Hunger Force as Terry.

In 2007, Pastore starred in the independent feature film P.J.: A Journey of the Heart. In 2008, he joined the cast of General Hospital as Maximus Giambetti, father of two characters on the show. He once again plays a mobster. He had roles in 2008's College Road Trip and Our Last Days As Children. He also starred in the 2008 film Dough Boys.

In 2009, Pastore starred in Pavaline Studio's debut short film, Alienated. In 2010, he starred in the award-winning indie mob-comedy Pizza With Bullets. Pastore played Mayor Avenoso in the 2012 indie feature Surviving Family.  He appears in the 2013 film I'm in Love with a Church Girl.

In 2014, he appeared in the Broadway musical Bullets Over Broadway as Nick Valenti.

Reality shows

Pastore lost 29 lbs on the fourth season of the VH1 reality show Celebrity Fit Club which ran from August 6 to October 1, 2006.

On February 20, 2007, ABC announced that Pastore would participate in the fourth season of the American version of the competitive dance series Dancing with the Stars. He withdrew from the competition after only one week. Pastore said that he found the necessary training and preparation too physically demanding. John Ratzenberger took his place in the competition.

Pastore was featured as a contestant on the January 2008 edition of Celebrity Apprentice. In the second week, he participated in raising $52,286 by selling hot dogs on a Manhattan street for The Lustgarten Foundation for Pancreatic Research. In a task of selling Broadway show tickets, with Pastore as project manager, he led his team to raise $33,300 for charity. In the fifth week, he got into a faked, blow-out conflict with the project manager of the task, Piers Morgan, in order to see if he could get the women to let him on their team to spy on them. The episode had played out like an episode of The Sopranos with Pastore switching allegiances multiple times.

Pastore was deliberately "ratted out" to the women by Morgan in the end, to make Pastore look bad to the women. While Pastore and the men then lost their task, before Trump even lifted a finger to fire anyone that week, Pastore resigned from the show and Trump eventually accepted Pastore's resignation after trying to convince him to stay. The show ended with a sequence based on the series finale of The Sopranos, ending abruptly before Pastore could give the customary end-of-show interview in the cab. Week 6 episode begins with Pastore meeting his ex-wife Nancy in a restaurant and presenting her the check he received for being project manager for $50,000, in memory of her husband, Mitchell Burke's memorial fund with the Lustgarden Foundation.

On July 1, 2008, Pastore appeared on NBC's new show, Celebrity Family Feud, as part of a family team trying to win $50,000 for their favorite charity. He first competed, with his friends and family, against the cast of The Girls Next Door. Then Pastore's team made it to the finals against Kathie Lee Gifford's family, but did not win. However, Pastore and his team picked up a $10,000 consolation prize for their charity, which is researching a cure for pancreatic cancer.

On April 8, 2011, Pastore and a business partner appeared on Shark Tank for an investment in "Broccoli Wad", a product that holds money. All the "Sharks" wanted out, and Barbara Corcoran said that "this is one of the dumbest things I've ever seen on this show". She later had the idea of putting Pastore's face and name on the box, and labeling it "Vinnie's Wad". She offered $50,000 for a 40% stake in the company, and would give half of her ownership to Pastore in exchange for his name and face on the packaging; Pastore and his partner agreed. A year later, Pastore made an appearance on an episode of truTV's World's Smartest Inventions after his commercial for "The Broccoli Wad" aired on the show.

As of July 10, 2011 he appeared on the VH1 Marc Cronin-produced reality show Famous Food. In the show, contestants are assigned the task of opening a restaurant on the Sunset Strip.

He appeared with Joseph R. Gannascoli on Gordon Ramsay's 24 Hours to Hell and Back on January 21, 2020.

Radio and podcast
Pastore previously hosted The Wiseguy Show on Sirius Satellite Radio on the now defunct Raw Dog channel 104. Described as a "weekly three-hour celebration of Italian-American culture." Produced by Sopranos co-star Steven Van Zandt, it currently airs on Wednesdays from 6pm-9pm ET. He has also had stints as a radio host on the New Rochelle, New York station WVOX in 2004 and 2012, with guest appearances in-between.

In September 2020, Pastore started a podcast with Goumba Johnny called Fuhgeddaboudit with Vinny Pastore.

Vincent Pastore's Italian Sauce
In 2019, Pastore launched a tomato sauce business under the name of Vincent Pastore's Italian Sauce. The sauce is made with San Marzano tomatoes, is non-GMO and has no added sugar.

Personal life
Pastore is divorced. He was previously married to Nancy Berke with whom he has a daughter, Renee. He befriended Berke's subsequent husband and donated the winnings from his stint on The Apprentice to a charity in his name. He currently lives on City Island. In 2014, Pastore was diagnosed with prostate cancer.

Filmography

Film

Television

Additional Voice Acting

References

External links

1946 births
Living people
American male film actors
American radio personalities
American male television actors
American people of Italian descent
Pace University alumni
Participants in American reality television series
People from City Island, Bronx
Male actors from New Rochelle, New York
United States Navy sailors
20th-century American male actors
21st-century American male actors
The Apprentice (franchise) contestants